Local elections were held in Santa Rosa, Laguna, on May 10, 2010, within the Philippine general election. The voters elected for the elective local posts in the city: the mayor, vice mayor, and ten councilors.

Overview
Incumbent Mayor Arlene B. Arcillas decided to run for reelection under Lakas. Her opponent is Former Barangay Chairman Romeo Aala, a nominee under NPC And Jose Catindig, Jr. Under Independent. Catindig also served as Mayor from 2005 to 2007.

Mayor Arcillas' running mate is incumbent Councilor Arnel Gomez, who is also under Lakas. His opponents are Incumbent Vice Mayor Manuel Alipon is a nominee under NPC

Candidates

Administration's Ticket

Opposition's Ticket

Others

Results
The candidates for mayor and vice mayor with the highest number of votes wins the seat; they are voted separately, therefore, they may be of different parties when elected.

Mayoral and vice mayoral elections

Santa Rosa City

City Council Elections

Voters will elect ten (10) councilors to comprise the City Council or the Sangguniang Panlungsod. Candidates are voted separately so there are chances where winning candidates will have unequal number of votes and may come from different political parties. The ten candidates with the highest number of votes win the seats.

 
 
 
 
 
 
 
 
 
 
|-
|bgcolor=black colspan=5|

References

External links

2010 Philippine local elections
Elections in Santa Rosa, Laguna
2010 elections in Calabarzon